A farmworker, farmhand or agricultural worker is someone employed for labor in agriculture. In labor law, the term "farmworker" is sometimes used more narrowly, applying only to a hired worker involved in agricultural production, including harvesting, but not to a worker in other on-farm jobs, such as picking fruit.

Agricultural work varies widely depending on context, degree of mechanization and crop. In countries like the United States where there is a declining population of American citizens working on farms — temporary or itinerant skilled labor from outside the country is recruited for labor-intensive crops like vegetables and fruits.

Agricultural labor is often the first community affected by the human health impacts of environmental issues related to agriculture, such as health effects of pesticides or exposure to other health challenges such as valley fever. To address these environmental concerns, immigration challenges and marginal working conditions, many labor rights, economic justice and environmental justice movements have been organized or supported by farmworkers.

Worldwide

In the United States

In Canada

Canada  had 297,683 agricultural employees; 112,059 were year-around and 185,624 were seasonal or temporary. Qualifying employers in Canada can hire temporary foreign farmworkers from participating countries for periods of up to 8 months per calendar year for on-farm primary agriculture in specified commodity sectors, if the work involved totals at least 240 hours within a period of 6 weeks or less. This Seasonal Agricultural Worker Program, established in 1966, brings about 25,000 foreign workers to Canada each year.  About 66 percent of those work in Ontario, 13 percent in Québec and 13 percent in British Columbia.

Workers in the Seasonal Agricultural Worker Program, being citizens of Mexico and various Caribbean countries, tend to be Spanish-speaking.  Between 1991 and 1996, in British Columbia, the number of South Asian agricultural workers increased from 3,685 to 5,685, mostly Punjabi-speaking. Analysis published in 2000 indicated that "Of the 5,000 workers employed by the over 100 licensed Farm Labour Contractors in British Columbia, two-thirds were recent immigrants who entered Canada less than 3 years ago. Of the 700 harvest workers surveyed, 97 percent were Punjabi speaking" (British Columbia did not participate in the Seasonal Agricultural Workers Program until 2004.).

Many of the issues noted for farmworkers in the US also apply in Canada. Analysis pertaining to Ontario noted that "All workers are eligible (with some variability) for provincial health insurance ... and workers compensation (WSIB), and are covered by provincial health and safety legislation through the Ministry of Labour, and yet [migrant farm workers] are not always able or willing to access these health and compensation services".

Every Canadian province and territory has an office that deals with labour and employment laws. A person at the local employment or labour-standards office can talk to farmworkers about fair pay, hours of work, rest periods and working conditions, and provide other services.  An employer cannot punish a farmworker for contacting an employment-standards office.

In Cuba

Prior to social changes in the 1960s, the all-important Cuban sugar-growing economy had an integrated rural-urban workforce —  each season, town-dwellers helped to bring in the harvest.
Subsequently, mechanisation ensued.

In Mexico
The Encuesta Nacional de Empleo estimated 2.7 million agricultural workers in Mexico.  About a million are migrants.  There is much use of seasonal and migrant agricultural labor in northwestern Mexico, because of the considerable fruit and vegetable production occurring in that region.  Rough estimates of peak seasonal labor requirements for Sinaloa, Sonora, and Baja California Norte and Sur are 400,000 to 600,000.

Several issues, particularly low pay and harsh working conditions, have been identified that pertain to some farmworkers in Mexico. Many of these issues are pursued by farmworker organizations, with resulting labor action, e.g.  strikes occurring in 2015.

Over the past quarter-century, water quality and pesticide issues affecting farmworkers in Mexico have been identified in peer-reviewed literature.  The following examples are of interest, but are not necessarily broadly representative.  In the Mezquital Valley of central Mexico, in the early 1990s, about 85,000 acres were irrigated with wastewater.  A study of the implications found that important outcomes were diarrheal disease and parasitic infections in farmworkers and their families. Pesticide issues were investigated in 200 farmworkers in a small area of northwestern Mexico in the 1990s.   Of those workers, 59% could read at the third-grade level, few had received information about pesticides; 30% did not wear personal protective gear; and 20% had experienced acute pesticide poisoning at least once during the season investigated. A study was conducted comparing 25 farm workers engaged in pesticide spraying with a control group of 21 workers not exposed to pesticides, from the Nextipac community in Jalisco, Mexico.  The exposed group showed acute poisoning in 20 percent of the cases.

In the European Union
For the 27 member states of the European Union in 2009, 77 percent of the overall average agricultural labor force was family members; however, in Slovakia, the Czech Republic, Bulgaria, Hungary and Estonia, family members were not predominant in the agricultural labor force.  Hired labor accounted for more than half of total (hired plus family) labor in the horticulture sector.  In the 27 states, the average wage of farm workers was €6.34. In 2010, there were estimated to be about 25 million agricultural workers, including farm family members, in the EU-27 states; many were part-time workers.  The full-time equivalents were estimated to be about 10 million.

Careers
Many programs exist, such as World-Wide Opportunities on Organic Farms (WWOOF) that facilitate the placement of volunteer farmworkers on specific types of farms. Additionally, farms may offer apprenticeship or internship opportunities where labor is traded for the knowledge and experience gained from a particular type of production.

See also

 Agroecology
 Farmer
 Manual labor
 Migrant worker
 Grower (disambiguation)
 Environmental Justice
 Peasant
 Subsistence agriculture

References

Further reading
 Flores, Lori A. Grounds for Dreaming: Mexican Americans, Mexican Immigrants, and the California Farmworker Movement (Yale University Press, 2016). xvi, 288 pp.

External links
 National Agricultural Workers Survey
 USDA National Agricultural Statistics Service
 Levine, Linda. 2006. The Effects on U.S. Farm Workers of an Agricultural Guest Worker Program. CRS Report for Congress.
 Farmworker Justice website
 Hundreds of millions of agricultural workers face poverty, hunger. UN report. 2005.
 National Institute for Occupational safety and Health: Agriculture
 Guest Worker Programs in the U.S.
When The U.S. Government Tried To Replace Migrant Farmworkers With High Schoolers

Agricultural occupations
Agricultural labor